Bakkevig is a surname. Notable people with the surname include:

Agnes Bakkevig (1910–1992), Norwegian politician
Ludvig Johan Bakkevig (1921–2013), Norwegian engineer and Christian leader
Trond Bakkevig (born 1948), Norwegian priest and organizational leader

Norwegian-language surnames